Frederick D'Souza (4 December 1934 – 11 July 2016) was a Roman Catholic bishop.

Ordained to the priesthood in 1961, D'Souza served as bishop of the diocese of Jhansi, India from 1977 to 2012.

Notes

1934 births
2016 deaths
20th-century Roman Catholic bishops in India
21st-century Roman Catholic bishops in India